Synaptura is a genus of soles. Most species are found in salt and brackish water in the Indo-Pacific and tropical East Atlantic, but S. salinarum is restricted to fresh water in Australia.

Paul Chabanaud retained the genus named Synaptura for this group and he designated Pleuronectes commersonniias its type species. This designation is incorrect according to the International Code of Zoological Nomenclature and Synaptura as designated by Theodore Edward Cantor is a synonym of Brachirus. Due to this some workers have assigned the species previously assigned to Synaptura, as raised by Chabanaud to Dagetichthys, a previously monotypic genus which contained just Dagetichthys lakdoensis. This more broadly defined Dagetichthys for a monophyletic clade. Buglossidium luteum seems to be the most closely related taxon to Dagetichthys.

Species
There are currently seven recognized species in this genus:
 Synaptura albomaculata Kaup, 1858 (Kaup's sole)
 Synaptura cadenati Chabanaud, 1948 (Guinean sole)
 Synaptura commersonnii (Lacépède, 1802) (Commerson's sole)
 Synaptura lusitanica de Brito Capello, 1868
 Synaptura lusitanica lusitanica de Brito Capello, 1868 (Portuguese sole)
 Synaptura lusitanica nigromaculata Pellegrin, 1905
 Synaptura marginata Boulenger, 1900 (White-margined sole)
 Synaptura megalepidoura (Fowler, 1934)
 Synaptura salinarum (J. D. Ogilby, 1910) (Saltpan sole)

References

Soleidae
Ray-finned fish genera
Taxa named by Theodore Edward Cantor